Eelam War II is the name given to the second phase of armed conflict between Sri Lankan military and the separatist Liberation Tigers of Tamil Eelam.  The war started after the failure of peace talks between the Premadasa government and the LTTE. This phase of the war was initiated by the LTTE who massacred almost 600 Sinhalese and Muslim police personnel after they were ordered by the Premadasa government to surrender to the LTTE.  The truce was broken on June 10, 1990 when the LTTE in October expelled all the 28,000 Muslims residing in Jaffna.

Military operations
The Eelam War II, saw the LTTE shifting to conventional warfare tactics with the deployment of large groups of soldiers to first attack isolated Sri Lanka Army detachments of platoon or company strength in the Northern Province such as Kokavil in June and July 1990 where it overran the detachment; Mullaitivu September 1990 which was relieved by Operation Sea Breeze the first  amphibious operation launched by the Sri Lankan military; while it kept the army garrison at the Jaffna Fort besieged until it was broken by Operation Thrividha Balaya in September 1990.  A major change in LTTE tactics came in the First Battle of Elephant Pass in which the LTTE besieged the army garrison of a full battalion strength at the strategic Elephant Pass from 10 July to 9 August 1991 until a relief force that had been led from the sea under Operation Balavegaya broke the siege. Casualties were high and the LTTE had deployed a large force of 5,000 cadres to lay siege to the army base and stop the relief force. LTTE continued to engage the army in small skirmishes and ambushes. The army also launched several limited operations with the aim of drawing out and killing LTTE carders. In August 1992, the military lost several of its senior leaders in a landmine explosion Araly point which killed Major General Denzil Kobbekaduwa and Brigadier Vijaya Wimalaratne, both charismatic field commanders, followed by the assassination of the head of the navy Vice Admiral Clancy Fernando in Colombo by a suicide bomber. In 1993, Sri Lankan President Ranasinghe Premadasa was assassinated by a LTTE suicide bomber on May day and LTTE was able to launch two major attacks on army detachments in the Battle of Janakapura and the Battle of Pooneryn, which resulted in major loss of life and equipment for the army.

Civilian killings

Massacre of police officers 

In June 1990, the LTTE eastern cadres, led by then-LTTE Eastern commander Karuna Amman, killed 774 police officers stationed in the Eastern province, after they had surrendered to the LTTE.

Palliyagodella massacre

The background to this attack was seen as a retaliation by the LTTE against Muslims believed to be working as an informers for the government forces in the Eastern region of Sri Lanka, and allegedly for their roles as Home Guards. The Palliyagodella villagers had asked the Sri Lankan military, fearing an attack by the LTTE, for protection. The Sri Lankan forces issued shotguns to the Muslims and Singhalese villagers, which some Muslims used to attack Tamil civilians and LTTE. Because of these incidents in October 1991 in which LTTE militants killed 109 Muslims in Palliyagodella.

See also

Eelam War I
Eelam War III
Eelam War IV
Sri Lankan Civil War

References

 
Phases of the Sri Lankan Civil War
1990s in Sri Lanka
1990s conflicts
Counterterrorism in Sri Lanka
Guerrilla wars
Tamil Eelam
History of Sri Lanka (1948–present)
Military history of Sri Lanka
1990 in Sri Lanka
1991 in Sri Lanka
1992 in Sri Lanka
1993 in Sri Lanka
1994 in Sri Lanka
1995 in Sri Lanka
Sri Lankan Civil War